Kahriz-e Jadid (also Romanized as Kahrīz-e Jadīd) is a village in Dehpir Rural District, in the Central District of Khorramabad County, Lorestan Province, Iran. In the 2006 census, its population was 907, in 192 families.

References 

Towns and villages in Khorramabad County